The Impetuoso class were the first post-World War II destroyers built for the Italian Navy. The two ships were ordered in February 1950, entered service in 1958 and were retired in the early 1980s.

Design
The Impetuoso class hull design was based on the uncompleted World War II . The ships has a complement of 315 personnel.

The class were armed with four /38 caliber guns in two twin-gun turrets, 16 Bofors 40 mm/60 guns consisted of two quad-mounts and four twin-mounts, and one 305 mm Menon anti-submarine mortar. They were also armed with two fixed  torpedo tubes, which was later replaced by two  triple-tubes with Mark 44 torpedoes. There was a proposed modernization program in the late 1960s for the ships to be rearmed with a single lightweight 5"/54 caliber Mark 45 gun forward and RIM-24 Tartar surface-to-air missile launcher in the aft.

The ships electronics and sensors consisted of SPS-6 air-search radar, SG-6B surface-search radar, SPG-25 and SPG-34 fire control radar, and SQS-11 search sonar, which was later replaced with SQS-4 sonar. As of 1980, Impetuoso was equipped with WLR-1 electronic support measure system with noise jammer, while Indomito appears to be not equipped with any electronic warfare system.

Ships

References

Bibliography

External links

 Destroyer Impetuoso Marina Militare website

 
Destroyers of the Italian Navy
Destroyer classes
Cold War naval ships of Italy